Ichhai Ghosher Deul is located near Gourangapur in the Indian state of West Bengal. It is a late mediaeval brick-built temple of the sikhara type without any image. Tradition says that Ichai Ghosh constructed the temple in honour of the Goddess Bhagabati.  However, this type of brick temple seen at Neiba Khera, Uttar Pradesh.

Location

The Ichai-Ghosh-temple is largely isolated by the river Ajay in the vicinity of the locality Gourangapur in the Paschim Bardhaman district in West Bengal, about 178.5  km (driving distance) North of Kolkata. Whether it has been in the vicinity of the temple, formerly a village, or whether the temple was a regional pilgrimage center, is unclear.

History
The date of construction of the temple is unclear. It may date from 7th to 11th century or 16th to18th century. According to tradition, Ichai Ghosh constructed it in honour of the Goddess Bhagabati. 

According to Binoy Ghosh, Ichhai Ghosher Deul, located at Gourangapur, is one of the few rekha deuls in Bengal. Scholars date it around 16th-17th century and it was possibly erected by the descendants of Ichhai Ghosh, to perpetuate his memory.

David J. McCutchion mentions Ichhai Ghoser Deul at Gourangapur as a large smooth curvilinear rekha deul, having a base of 20 feet square. It is a plain brick structure but for niches and images on tower.

According to the List of Monuments of National Importance in West Bengal, the Ichhai Ghosh Temple is an ASI listed monument.

Architecture

The temple  is about 18 m high. It has an windowless Cella (garbhagriha). Its basement is almost square.

Building Decoration

The austere round-arched portal, is of a rectangular frame enclosed; each of the two niches in of amalaka and kalasha - crowned fields of the upper Zone show on all four sides of polyfoil arches and not further identifiable figures of gods. Bright plaster residue on the outer walls point to the fact that the temple was temporarily plastered.

Ichhai Ghoser Deul picture gallery

References

External links
 Ichai-Ghosh-Temple – photos + Short Infos (English)

Hindu temples in West Bengal
Monuments of National Importance in West Bengal
Tourist attractions in Paschim Bardhaman district
Buildings and structures in Paschim Bardhaman district